Madhubala – Ek Ishq Ek Junoon is an Indian television series that premiered on 28 May 2012 and ran through until 9 August 2014, Produced to celebrate 100 years of Indian cinema, it aired on Colors TV Monday to Friday (later Saturday) evenings.

Plot

Madhubala "Madhu" Choudhary was born on a film set and works in a parlour; her family members are junior artists in the Mumbai film industry. She fights a case of hit and run on behalf of Mukund against Bollywood superstar Rishabh Kundra "RK" who gets jailed. Mukund proposes Madhu and they get engaged. RK insinuates that Madhu is his girlfriend and humiliates Padmini and Shamsher's relationship, saying they're having a secret affair for last 20 years.

Mukund breaks off his engagement thinking Madhu has an affair with RK. She slaps RK who puts forward an offer for Shamsher's treatment as he was badly beaten up on RK's set. RK asks Madhu to marry him which she accepts. Rude and egotistical, he becomes hell-bent on ruining her life. Eventually, Madhu begins falling for him. Sikandar's wife Deepali wants her to leave RK but in vain. Shamsher shoots RK; Madhu donates her blood to save him.

No longer rude to Madhu, RK begins loving her. She restores his relation with Radha. The two confess their love; RK helps Padmini and Shamsher in getting married. Balraj abducts all but is shot to death by Padmini. RK needs a break and says he wants to marry Madhu properly so they can take their marriage forward. But suddenly, he tells he'd never loved her; it was his plan to entangle her in his love and then destroy her life when he leaves her.

Devastated, Madhu moves on. Everyone convinces RK to bring her back but he doesn't budge on his decision. Madhu gets a job as a hairstylist at RK's film set. He is again rude to her and adamant to make her leave. Later he decides to win her back and abducts her to forcefully live with her at his home. Earlier, Madhu not relents. Enters Sultan. Madhu leaves saying she won't come back unless RK confesses his love. He finally proposes her, and they unite.

The preparation for grand wedding begins. Sultan falls in love with Madhu, and is now vengeful on RK. Being his half-brother, he uses this to humiliate him. Sultan refers to RK as a bastard as Mohan firstly married Meera. Sultan fakes his death and RK is jailed, until Madhu learns the truth.
Sultan asks her to divorce RK and come to him to save him. Helpless, Madhu agrees. Enraged, RK uncovers Sultan's deeds and eventually kills Sultan with the police to save Madhu.

Due to some reasons, RK is banned from Bollywood and plans to produce his own film. To help him, veteran director Mehul Chopra selects Madhu as the heroine but RK refuses and is actually fascinated by idea of her being heroine.
RK finds a heroine but is dissatisfied and vows not to pressurize Madhu to sign the film. Thinking his career is over, RK is about to commit suicide when his assistant Bittu informs him Madhu has stepped in as the heroine.

Super excited, RK appears as the lead of his film in front of media with Madhu who marks her entry into Bollywood. He confesses that he loves and thanks Madhu for becoming his heroine. After sometime during shooting, RK is injured and suffers paralysis. Madhu decides to finish the film. RK develops insecurity to her due to her rising fame and being ignored by everyone because he is handicapped. Madhu gets pregnant but RK doesn't want a baby, breaking her heart.

The film "Ishq Ek Junoon" becomes a superhit, with RK out of his problems. Madhu miscarries and blames him who tries his best to avert her mind from getting into film industry. Later, Madhu turns a heroine like she was destined to be. RK's look-alike KRK is introduced, hired by Kulbhushan for revenge for RK. KRK agrees to take RK's place in need of money but leaves his life when he realizes of separating him from Madhu.

KRK returns to his hometown with prize money from RK for speaking up the truth and showing decency. Kulbhushan is arrested. Pregnant once again, Madhu gives birth to a girl whom RK also names Madhubala. He prophesies that she will become a superstar like her parents. RK and Madhu die in a bomb blast planned by Pam Harshvardhan kapoor and NikhilLamba. Radha escapes with baby Madhu.

20 years later

Jr. Madhubala is now grown-up and looks like Madhu. She lives with Radha and falls in love with Abhay Kapoor. They announce their marriage but he gets her married to Raja, RK's mentally challenged second lookalike.

Abhay reveals he wanted to avenge death of his father Harsh Vardhan who committed suicide after being incriminated for killing RK and Madhu. Actually KRK's son, Raja finally becomes a normal person and also kills abhay kapoor for torturing madhu and him. Due to his life of a gangster, Madhubala hates and insults him. Angry, Raja rapes her. She files a case and gets him jailed but withdraws it later.

Baiji dies. Being jailed, Raja thinks Madhubala is the reason for it and begins hating and torturing her. Pregnant with his child, she later requests him to forgive her which Raja does. They remarry. One night, a producer assumes Raja as RK and proposes to do a film with him that the producer had wanted to do with RK and Madhu.

Madhubala reads Madhu's diary, learning her last wish was to make a film on her and RK's life. She convinces Raja to sign the film; they start their career and appear as Madhu and RK, giving the first shot of their film. Raja states it's not the end but the beginning of a new life as they were always destined to live and be superstars together.

Cast

Main
 Drashti Dhami as 
 Madhubala "Madhu" Malik, Madhubala Rishabh Kundra – Balraj and Padmini's daughter; Shamsher's adoptive daughter; Trishna's half-sister; RK's wife; Jr. Madhubala's mother (2012–2014) (dead)
 Jr. Madhubala Kundra Kushwaha – RK and Madhu's daughter; Raja's wife (2014)
 Spandan Chaturvedi as young Jr. Madhubala Kundra (2014)
 Vivian Dsena as 
 Rishabh "RK" Kundra – Mohan and Radha's son; Sultan and Sikandar's half-brother; Madhu's husband; Jr. Madhubala's father (2012–2014) (dead)
 Keval Ram "KRK" Kushwaha – RK's lookalike; Jugnu's brother; Kulbhushan's accomplice; Raja's father (2013–2014)
 Raja "Raju" Kushwaha – KRK's son; Jr. Madhubala's husband (2014)

Recurring
 Pallavi Purohit as Padmini Malik: Balraj's ex-wife; Shamsher's wife; Madhu's mother; Trishna's adoptive mother (2012–2013)(dead)
 Bhupinder Singh as Shamsher Malik: Roma's brother; Padmini's second husband; Madhu and Trishna's adoptive father (2012–2013)(dead)
 Aarti Puri as Trishna Choudhary: Balraj's daughter; Padmini and Shamsher's adoptive daughter; Madhu's half-sister (2012–2013)(dead)
  Rakhee Tandon as Roma Malik: Shamsher's sister (2012–2013)(dead)
 Shama Deshpande as Radha Kulbhushan Bhatia: Mohan's former wife; Kulbhushan's wife; RK and Sikandar's mother, Jr Madhubala's grandmother (2012–2014)
 Indresh Malik as Barun "Bittu" Sharma: RK's personal secretary; Leela's husband; Sweety and Sunny's father (2012–2014)
 Raza Murad as Kulbhushan Bhatia: Radha's second husband; RK's step-father; Sikandar's father (2012–2014)(dead)
 Sikandar Kharbanda as Sikandar Bhatia: Kulbhushan and Radha's son; RK's half-brother; Deepali's husband(dead)
 Seema Mishra as Deepali Bhatia: RK's former girlfriend; Sikandar's wife (dead)
 Ahmad Harhash as Ram Pratap Chatturvedi Parmeet Paabo Kundera Mohan,s Sister (2012-2014)
 Navneet Nishan /  Seema Kapoor as Parmeet "Paabo" Kundra: Mohan's sister (dead)
 Avinesh Rekhi as Sultan Kundra: Mohan and Meera's son; RK's half-brother; Asmita's widower; Aryan's father (2012–2013) (dead)
 Siddharth Vasudev as Bhujang Shastri
 Zarina Wahab as Meera Mohan Kundra: Mohan's second wife; Sultan's mother (dead)
 Kannan Arunachalam as Rashid Baig: Mohan's driver
 Raj Zutshi as Balraj Choudhary: Shobha's son; Padmini's ex-husband; Trishna and Madhu's father (2012–2013) (dead)
 Shagufta Ali as Shobha Choudhary/Badi Choudhrain:(double role) Balraj's mother (2012)
 Lalit Parimoo as Hansmukh Ram Naigatre (Guruji) (2012)
 Sushmita Mukherjee as Dai Maa (2012)
 Prashant Chawla as Sunil "Sunny" Sharma: Bittu and Leela's son; Sweety's brother; Jr. Madhubala's friend (2014)
 Swati Anand as Leelavati "Leela" Barun Sharma: Bittu's wife; Sweety and Sunny's mother (2013–2014)
 Shweta Vyas / Tanvi Thakkar as Sweety Sharma / Sweety Kapoor: Leela and Bittu's daughter; Sunny's sister;Abhay 's fake wife (2013)
 Vaishnavi Dhanraj as Riya Mehrotra
 Manini Mishra as Journalist Ilana "Ila" Ramani
 Usha Nadkarni as Sonali Dixit: Mukund and Swati's mother (2012)
 Manish Naggdev as Mukund Dixit: Sonali's son; Swati's brother; Madhu's ex-fiancé (2012)
 Ahsaas Channa as Swati Dixit: Sonali's daughter; Mukund's sister (2012)
 Anita Hassanandani as Sanya Nair
 Vinay Apte as Shivdutt Marathe 
 Neelu Kohli as Harjeet Kapoor: Harsh and Umesh's mother (2014)
 Arbaaz Ali Khan as Harsh Vardhan Kapoor: Film Director; Harjeet's son; Umesh's brother; Pammi's husband; Abhay and Ananya's father (2013–2014)(dead)
 Deepshikha Nagpal as Pammi "Pam" Kapoor: Harsh's second wife; Ananya's mother,RK and Madhu's murderer(2014)
 Puneet Sachdev as Nikhil Lamba: Ananya's husband,Rk and Madhu's murderer (2014)
 Kishwer Merchant as Ananya Nikhil Lamba: Harsh and Pammi's daughter; Abhay's half-sister; Nikhil's wife (2014)
 Gunjan Utreja as Abhay Kapoor: Harsh's son from his first marriage; Ananya's half-brother; Jr. Madhubala's ex-fiancé;sweety's fake husband;Killed by Raja (2014)(dead)
 Rajesh Balwani as Umesh Kapoor: Harjeet's son; Harsh's brother; Dolly's husband; Aisha's father (2014)
 Utkarsha Naik as Daljeet "Dolly" Umesh Kapoor: Umesh's wife; Aisha's mother (2014)
 Fenil Umrigar as Ayesha Kapoor: Umesh and Dolly's daughter;abhay ananya's cousin (2014)
 Ravi Khanvilkar as Jignesh "Jugnu" Ram Kushwaha: KRK's brother; Baiji's husband; Agni's father (2014)
 Shraddha Jaiswal as Agni Kushwaha: Jugnu and Baiji's daughter (2014)
 Shalini Arora / Jaya Bhattacharya as Namita "Baiji" Jignesh Ram Kushwaha: Jugnu's wife; Agni's mother (2014)(dead)
 Sheetal Thakkar as Tara
 Jaswant Menaria as Bhanu Pratap Singh
 Pooja Sahu as Faguni Kushwaha
 Neha Pendse as Ria
 Rajshri Rani as Deepika\
 Kabbir as Rohan
 Sara Khan
 Tejasswi Prakash as Dhara
 Toral Rasputra as Anandi
 Sanaya Irani as Parvati
 Dipika Kakar as Simar2 New entry Arav
 Radhika Madan as Ishani (to promote Meri Aashiqui Tum Se Hi
 Sidharth Shukla as Shiv

Awards and nominations

References

External links

Madhubala – Ek Ishq Ek Junoon on Voot

Colors TV original programming
Indian television soap operas
2012 Indian television series debuts
2014 Indian television series endings
Bollywood in fiction